QVP or qvp may refer to:

 QVP, the IATA code for Avaré-Arandu Airport, Brazil
 qvp, the ISO 639-3 code for Pacaraos Quechua, Peru